The 2011 Australian Sports Sedan season was the 27th season of Australian Sports Sedan motor racing in which a national championship or national series has been contested. The season featured the 2011 Kerrick Sports Sedan Series, which began on 14 May 2011 at Mallala Motor Sport Park and ended on 6 November at Phillip Island Grand Prix Circuit after fifteen races. The series was televised on SBS program SBS Speedweek.

After winning four rounds and ten races in the 2011 Series, Western Australian Alfa Romeo GTV driver Tony Ricciardello took his seventh Sports Sedan series victory, expanding his own record. Ricciardello won by 112 points from Queensland Chevrolet Camaro driver Shane Bradford.

Eligible vehicles
Automobiles that complied with the provisions of any one of the following groups were eligible to compete in the Series:
 SS: Group 3D Sports Sedans regulations as published by the Confederation of Australian Motor Sport
 TA: 2011 SCCA Pro Racing Regulations Article 4 for Trans-am
 TNZ: Schedule TZ regulations published by MotorSport New Zealand

Teams and drivers

 

The following drivers competed in the 2011 Kerrick Sports Sedan Series.

Race calendar

The 2011 Kerrick Sports Sedan Series was contested over five rounds, each of which was held at Shannons Nationals Motor Racing Championships rounds.

Point system 
Points were awarded 20–17–15–13–12–11–10–9–8–7–6–5–4–3–2 based on the top fifteen race positions in each race, with each other race finisher receiving 1 point. There were two bonus points allocated for pole position. Pole position is indicated in bold text.

Series standings

References

External links
 Official series website
 Shannons Nationals Motor Racing Championships
 Natsoft Race Results

National Sports Sedan Series
Sports Sedans